Md. Mahbub Ali (born 17 July 1961) is a Bangladesh Awami League politician and the incumbent Member of Parliament from Habiganj-4. He is the state minister for civil aviation and tourism.

Early life
Ali was born on 17 July 1961. He has a B.A. and a LLB.

Career 
Ali was elected to parliament from Habiganj-4 as a candidate of Awami League in 2014 with 122,433 votes.

Ali was elected to parliament from Habiganj-4 as a candidate of Awami League on 30 December 2018 with 306,953 votes. His nearest rival, Ahmad Abdul Quader of the Khelafat Majlish, received 45,151 votes.

References

1961 births
Living people
Awami League politicians
10th Jatiya Sangsad members
11th Jatiya Sangsad members
People from Habiganj District